The list below show the first international of the African national football teams of both FIFA and CAF associate members who are still not members of FIFA.

FIFA recognised first internationals 

International matches stated below are according to the FIFA official records since January 1872.
The matches listed below shouldn't always be the first international matches kept in the national football associations records, as FIFA keeps records for countries after being affiliated.
First international match is for those teams stated first.

Local associations recognised first internationals 
International matches stated below are not recognized by the FIFA as the national associations were not affiliated by the time of the match.
Official records for these matches are kept and recognized by the local football associations.
First international match is for those teams stated first.

1:Match approved by FIFA to be first international.
†:CAF associate member, Non-FIFA member.
‡:CAF associate member, Non-FIFA member, Nouvelle Fédération Board member.

See also

References

Confederation of African Football
Association football in Africa